The men's 100 metres event at the 1989 Summer Universiade was held at the Wedaustadion in Duisburg with the final on 25 and 26 August 1989.

Medalists

Results

Heats
Wind:Heat 1: +0.8 m/s, Heat 2: +0.6 m/s, Heat 3: 0.0 m/s, Heat 4: +0.8 m/s, Heat 5: +1.2 m/s, Heat 6: +0.8 m/s, Heat 7: +0.4 m/s

Quarterfinals
Wind:Heat 1: +2.9 m/s, Heat 2: +1.0 m/s, Heat 3: +1.1 m/s, Heat 4: +1.8 m/s

Semifinals
Wind:Heat 1: -1.4 m/s, Heat 2: +0.5 m/s

Final

Wind: -1.3 m/s

References

Athletics at the 1989 Summer Universiade
1989